Cui Xiaodi (born March 7, 1989) is a Chinese ski mountaineer, and member of the national selection of the People's Republic of China.

Selected results 
 2007:
 4th, Asian Championship
 2009:
 2nd, Asian Championship, relay (mixed teams), together with Huang Chunsen, Jin Yubo and Xin Detao
 3rd, Asian Championship, individual
 3rd, Asian Championship, vertical race

References

External links 
 Cui Xiaodi at SkiMountaineering.org
 

1989 births
Living people
Chinese female ski mountaineers
21st-century Chinese women